Fabius Township is a civil township of St. Joseph County in the U.S. state of Michigan. The population was 3,285 at the 2000 census.

History
Fabius Township was originally established in 1829 with the name of Bucks Township and was renamed to its current name in 1840.

Geography

Demographics
As of the census of 2000, there were 3,285 people, 1,304 households, and 984 families residing in the township. The racial makeup of the township was 96.74% White, 0.94% African American, 0.40% Native American, 0.55% Asian, 0.30% from other races, and 1.07% from two or more races. Hispanic or Latino of any race were 1.04% of the population.

There were 1,304 households, out of which 27.3% had children under the age of 18 living with them, 67.3% were married couples living together, 5.3% had a female householder with no husband present, and 24.5% were non-families. 20.1% of all households were made up of individuals, and 8.0% had someone living alone who was 65 years of age or older.  The average household size was 2.51 and the average family size was 2.86.

In the township the population was spread out, with 22.7% under the age of 18, 6.1% from 18 to 24, 25.4% from 25 to 44, 30.6% from 45 to 64, and 15.3% who were 65 years of age or older.  The median age was 42 years. For every 100 females, there were 102.4 males.  For every 100 females age 18 and over, there were 102.7 males.

The median income for a household in the township was $50,888, and the median income for a family was $58,023. Males had a median income of $40,671 versus $26,004 for females. The per capita income for the township was $23,474.  About 3.1% of families and 3.6% of the population were below the poverty line, including 2.9% of those under age 18 and 6.1% of those age 65 or over.

References

Notes

Sources

Townships in St. Joseph County, Michigan
1829 establishments in Michigan Territory
Townships in Michigan